Isuf Çela (born 18 September 1996, in Elbasan) is an Albanian former professional footballer who last played as a midfielder for Italian club San Donato.

Career
He gained entry at the first team of A.C. Prato in the 2013–14 season as he called up by the coach Vincenzo Esposito to participate in the opening match against L'Aquila on 1 September 2013. In this match Çela was an unused substitute for the entire match. He made it his debut three weeks later on 22 September 2013 against Gubbio coming on as a substitute in the 89th minute in place of Matteo Serrotti and the match finished as a goalless draw. He finished the first half of the season with a total of 5 matches played then was loaned out to Bologna F.C. 1909 during the January 2014.

Career statistics

Club

References

1996 births
Living people
Footballers from Elbasan
Albanian footballers
Albania youth international footballers
Association football midfielders
A.C. Prato players
U.S. Poggibonsi players
Serie C players
Albanian expatriate footballers
Albanian expatriate sportspeople in Italy
Expatriate footballers in Italy